Stormworld is a drama television series which first aired on Space on 18 March 2009 in Canada with a repeat broadcast in August 2009 and aired in Australia on the Nine Network in 2009.

The show follows two boys, Jason (Andrew Jenkins) and Lee (Calum Worthy), after they are transported through a vortex while on a boat trip that started in Vancouver, Canada, to an alien world, Stormworld, with three suns. The boys receive help from Flees (Valentina Barron), a seasoned veteran of living on Stormworld who has a special boat named Stormrider. The boys, as new arrivals or "access crashers" as the local inhabitants call them, find shelter at The Settlement.

Stormworld is the destination for people and objects from many different worlds. Transport to Stormworld happens when a vortex is created between Stormworld and another world by large beetle-like insects. The surface of Stormworld is a saltwater ocean with many islands that have a generally hot climate. Fresh water is a scarce resource that is central to the survival of all inhabitants. This leads to everyone constantly searching for fresh water, including the fabled Great Water. Trade and barter of the objects brought through the vortices operate as the basis of the inhabitants' economy.

People
There are three principal groups of inhabitants on Stormworld: The Settlement, the Arkoddians, and the Drogue. Conflict between the groups happens regularly on the show.

The Settlement
The Settlement is a constitutionally-based society with democratic principles. The Settlement is located at the Sighing Peaks on an island. It was founded by Werrolda who wrote its constitution. When Jason and Lee arrive, Werrolda is the leader. High on a hill not far from the Settlement is a beacon that flashes a bright light at regular intervals to attract other "access crashers" after arriving in a Vortex.

Arkoddians
The Arkoddians are a tightly hierarchical society run by the patriarchs. They live on an island a significant distance away from the Settlement. Each Arkoddian requires more water per day than a human. Some of the Arkoddians are armed with lazbolts. Unlike most of the other people on Stormworld, the Arkoddians appear to have arrived as a group on a large boat.

The Drogue
The Drogue are a small band of thugs that prey on the Settlement and collect objects from the vortices. They are equipped with flybikes that are armed with energy cannons.

The Abiders
The Abiders were a race of people who occupied Stormworld sometime ago. They placed the sighing peaks in order to create a map, and presumably were the creators of the portal that leads off the planet.

Characters
There is a large cast of characters for Stormworld with most of the action centering on Jason, Lee, Flees, Ogee, and Khelioz across all of the episodes.

Jason (Andrew Jenkins) – an athletic, high-energy, positive person who has strong leadership qualities. Lee is his best friend, also from Earth and arrived on Stormworld at the same time. Jason is the pilot of the boat named Cougar. In the final episode he decides to stay behind with Flees and Ogee and become leader of The Settlement.
Lee (Calum Worthy) – an intelligent, savvy and logical individual with a strong scientific mind. He arrived on Stormworld with his best friend, Jason. Lee wants very much to return to Earth, which he does in episode 26.
Flees (Valentina Barron) – arrived 7 years ago with her father, an engineer, after their small aircraft was drawn through a vortex from Earth. Flees' father disappeared four years after their arrival on Stormworld when he went out kayaking. Now 15 years old, she has continued an ongoing search to find her missing father for the past 3 years. Her searching has provided her with an excellent knowledge of geography of Stormworld. Luce regards Flees as an older sister.
Ogee (voiced by Andrew Kavadas) – an extremely clever talking bowling ball.
Khelioz (Lim Kay Tong) – also known as The Navigator. On his home world of Maren, Khelioz was a fisherman. On Stormworld he is a trader with a small sailing vessel who is trying to collect information to learn where the portal is for people to return to their home planets. His methods are often viewed as being sneaky or self-serving.

Episodes
Stormworld consists of 26 episodes 

 "Three Sun Day"
 "The Settlement"
 "Barter, Barter Everywhere"
 "Callaghan"
 "Salvage Rights"
 "Out of the Frying Pan"
 "Bouncing Ball"
 "Escape from New Arkoddia"
 "Family Ties"
 "Changing Tides"
 "Farmer Flees"
 "Family First"
 "The Race Is On"
 "Luce Island"
 "Deep Down"
 "Fire and Flight"
 "The Old Order Changes"
 "Raising the Cougar"
 "A Hot Bath"
 "A Handful of Sand"
 "Lord of the Flybikes"
 "Twists and Turns"
 "Liberation Day"
 "The Great Water"
 "Long Way Home"
 "Homeward Bound"

International syndication

Production
The series was shot in Australia and Canada in 2008. Post-production sound and effects was done by Kojo Productions, who sued the production company for more than $265,000 in 2010 for unpaid invoices.

Critical response
When it premiered in Canada, it was called a "a hyper-flimsy sci-fi offering" with "cheesy low-budget special effects". Andre Jenkins, Calum Worthy, and Valentina Barron were all nominated for the Best Performance in a TV Series at the 2010 Young Artist Awards with Worthy winning the award for leading young actor in a drama series.

References

External links
 Stormworld at the Australian Television Information Archive
 
 Blackmagic Design provides Stormworld graphics

Nine Network original programming
CTV Sci-Fi Channel original programming
2009 Australian television series debuts
2009 Australian television series endings
2009 Canadian television series debuts
2009 Canadian television series endings
2000s Canadian children's television series
2000s Canadian science fiction television series
Canadian children's science fiction television series
Australian children's television series
Australian science fiction television series
Television series about teenagers
Television shows filmed in Burnaby